Qarabağlar (also, Garabaghlar) is a village in the Goychay District of Azerbaijan. It forms part of the municipality of Şəhadət.

References 

Populated places in Goychay District